Teniz is a lake in Mendykara District, Kostanay Region, Kazakhstan.

The lake is part of the most important wetlands of Northern Kazakhstan and is a  Important Bird Area under threat.

Geography
Lake Karakamys is located close by at the northern end, as a continuation. River Ubagan flows northwards  to the east of the lake's eastern shore. The lake freezes in the winter and is fed by snow and groundwater.

Flora and fauna
There is thick reed growth around the lake. Every year there are thousands of migratory birds stopping over at the Teniz and Karakamys lakes during the spring and autumn migrations. The main fish species in the waters are crucian carp, wild goldfish and lake minnow.

See also
List of lakes of Kazakhstan

References

External links
Rare Birds Records
Geographical places in Kostanay Region, Kazakhstan

Lakes of Kazakhstan
Kostanay Region
Important Bird Areas of Kazakhstan